Witanhurst is a large Grade II listed 1930s Georgian Revival mansion on  in Highgate, North London. It has had several prominent owners since being rebuilt by soap magnate Sir Arthur Crosfield. After several decades of increasing dilapidation, it underwent substantial refurbishment after its 2008 sale to an offshore company owned by the family of Russian businessman Andrey Guryev.

History
The original estate, dating from 1774, was known as Parkfield, situated at the junction of Highgate West Hill and The Grove. The current house, built between 1913 and 1920, was designed by architect George Hubbard for soap magnate Sir Arthur Crosfield on an  site. The mansion is Grade-II* listed, meaning it has been judged to be of national historic or architectural interest. English Heritage has in the late twentieth-century and early twenty-first century placed the property on its Buildings at Risk Register.

Paul Crosfield sold Witanhurst to the property developer Lionel Green in 1970, but it was possessed by banks shortly after, and owned by various other property developers for the next fifteen years. Various schemes for redeveloping Witanhurst were proposed and rejected by Camden council during this period including turning the house into a hotel or apartments, and various pieces of land from Witanhurst's large estate were sold.

In 1976, Witanhurst was bought by Al-Hasouwy for £1.3 million. He subsequently spent £500,000 developing the property. It was then put up for sale in 1977 for £7 million with planning permission for 63 houses. In 1984, the house was sold for £7 million by Noble Investment Corporation, a shell company believed to have been linked to the al-Hasawi family. Additionally, a revised scheme for 24 houses to be built on part of the land was sold for more than £7 million. The buyer of the house was Mounir Developments, a company registered in the tax haven of Panama. The ultimate beneficial owner of Mounir Developments was eventually revealed in a court case to be a relation of the Assad family, the ruling family of Syria, who were then in exile in England. Somar al-Assad, a cousin of the then Syrian president Bashar al-Assad, stated in a court case that he had not slept at Witanhurst in the previous eight years of ownership by a trust connected to the family.

Witanhurst was used as the location of BBC's Fame Academy talent show from 2002 to 2004. The interior of the house was renovated to add a recording studio and gym. During its use on the show Witanhurst was on English Heritage's list of buildings "at risk". In 2002, during the first series of Fame Academy, nine portable buildings, a television studio and generators were erected in front of Witanhurst without the requisite consent required for a listed building. The production company Endemol withdrew their application to use Witanhurst for a planned third series of the show in 2004 following a critical report by planners from Camden London Borough Council.

In 2007 the Assads sold Witanhurst to the British property developer Marcus Cooper for £32.5 million. Cooper subsequently repaired Witanhurst to satisfy Camden council's previous complaints, and put the property up for sale for £75 million through the estate agents Glentree Estates and Knight Frank.

Witanhurst was bought by the family of the Russian billionaire Andrey Guryev through an offshore company called Safran Holdings, located in the tax haven of the British Virgin Islands for £50 million in 2008. The owner of Witanhurst was not publicly known from its 2008 sale until the publication of a 2015 article by Ed Caesar in The New Yorker magazine.

In September 2009 The Sunday Times erroneously stated that Witanhurst had been bought by Elena Baturina, the wife of the former Mayor of Moscow, Yuri Luzhkov, via an offshore front company. Baturina sued the newspaper's owners Times Newspapers, a subsidiary of News International. Times Newspapers apologised for the story and paid damages to Baturina in October 2011.

The redevelopment of Witanhurst has received widespread attention in the media, much of it focusing on the large basement extension to the main house that extends for two storeys below the entire footprint of the building. Over 90,000 square feet, Witanhurst is the second largest private residence in London, after Buckingham Palace. It is said to be worth $450 million.

Facilities
The mansion has 65 rooms spread across three floors, including 25 bedrooms. It has oak flooring and the timber wall panels are in walnut, with carved cornices embellished with gold leaf.

Other rooms are the drawing room, study, entrance hall and staircase, and most of the bedrooms are all in an opulent classical style. Other richly decorated rooms include the dining room, Chinese room, billiard room, and the gallery hallway. Access to the property is via a three-fingered gatehouse.

Filming location
Witanhurst has been used on several occasions as a filming location by various production companies including the BBC, to shoot films and television programmes such as The Lost Prince, Tipping the Velvet, and Fame Academy.

References

External links
"Titles With Location Matching "Witanhurst House, Highgate West Hill, Highgate, London, England, UK", imdb.com

Grade II* listed buildings in the London Borough of Camden
Grade II* listed houses in London
Highgate
Houses completed in 1920
Houses in the London Borough of Camden
Gardens by Harold Peto
Harold Peto buildings